Ogna, also Oghna, is a village in Jhadol tehsil, Udaipur district, Rajasthan, India. It is mostly dependent on agriculture.

History
In 16th century, Ogna was ruled by an Brahmin chief, Udairaj. 
Nahar Singh Solanki (Naharu Ji), the younger son of Rana Harpal of  Panarwa, established his control of Ogna after killing Udairaj in 1585 AD. Ogna had 17 villages, with total income of 11,000 rupees.
Nahar Singh’s descendants continued to rule over Ogna, till Independence, with title of Rawat.

References

Sources
 
 
 Udaipur.Rajasthan.gov.in - Blocks, Tehsils, Panchayats
 Census of India 1961: vol XVI - Rajasthan (pdf)

Villages in Udaipur district